The 1998 Amsterdam Admirals season was the fourth season for the franchise in the NFL Europe League (NFLEL). The team was led by head coach Al Luginbill in his fourth year, and played its home games at Amsterdam ArenA in Amsterdam, Netherlands. They finished the regular season in third place with a record of seven wins and three losses.

Personnel

Staff

Roster

Standings

References

Amsterdam Admirals seasons